The Swiss Family Robinson is an 1812 novel by Johann David Wyss.

The Swiss Family Robinson or Swiss Family Robinson may also refer to:

Film adaptations
Swiss Family Robinson (1940 film), American film directed by Edward Ludwig
Swiss Family Robinson (1960 film), American film produced by Walt Disney Productions and directed by Ken Annakin
The New Swiss Family Robinson, 1998 American film directed by Stewart Raffill

TV series
Swiss Family Robinson (1974 TV series), Canadian drama series starring Chris Wiggins and Diana Leblanc
The Adventures of Swiss Family Robinson, a 1998 series starring Richard Thomas
The Swiss Family Robinson (1975 TV series), American adventure series starring Martin Milner and Pat Delaney
The Swiss Family Robinson: Flone of the Mysterious Island, Japanese animated series